The River North Correctional Center is a state prison for men located in Independence, Grayson County, Virginia, owned and operated by the Virginia Department of Corrections.  

The facility was opened in 2013 and has a working capacity of 1024 prisoners held at a medium security level.

Notable inmates 
Rodney Fuller - Accomplice of Teresa Lewis, who became last woman to be executed in Virginia.

David Wayne Hoshaw - Murdered his fiancé Angelique Goyena and her mother Vonda.

References

External links

 local news coverage in 2014 

Prisons in Virginia
Buildings and structures in Grayson County, Virginia
2013 establishments in Virginia